Chester Wright may refer to:

 Chester Ellis Wright (1897–1933), American World War I flying ace
 Chester W. Wright (1879–1966), American economic historian